The list of ship commissionings in 2006 includes a chronological list of all ships commissioned in 2006.


See also 

2006
 Ship commissionings